The women's slopestyle competition of the 2015 Winter Universiade was held at Sulayr Snowpark, Sierra Nevada, Spain at February 13, 2015.

Results

Women's slopestyle